Valiente may refer to:

Valiente (surname), a surname
Valiente (wrestler), a Mexican wrestler
Valiente Peak, a mountain of Antarctica
Valiente (1992 TV series), a Philippine television series
Valiente (2012 TV series), a Philippine television series
Valiente (album), a 2018 album by Thalía
"Valiente", 1987 song by Pimpinela

See also
Corazón Valiente, an American telenovela
Principe Valiente, a Swedish musical group